Lake Side Power Station  is a natural gas turbine combined cycle power plant in Vineyard, Utah, United States. The plant consists of 2 power blocks, each containing a 2x1 combined cycle power plant.  It was built by with Siemens Westinghouse Power Corporation and is operated by PacifiCorp which does business in Utah as Rocky Mountain Power.

The station was completed in 2007 with daily average production of 550 megawatts of electricity. In 2014, a second Block went online, bringing the total megawatt production to 1100. Twenty-two of the  site on which the plant is built were part the site of the Geneva Steel steel mill and meets government pollution regulatory requirements with emission offset credits purchased from Geneva Steel. The plant and its steam plume are usually visible from Interstate 15 between the Orem/Lindon and Pleasant Grove exits near the northeastern corner of Utah Lake.

References

External links

 Summit Vineyard, LLC Home Page

Natural gas-fired power stations in Utah
Buildings and structures in Utah County, Utah
Energy infrastructure completed in 2007
Vineyard, Utah
2007 establishments in Utah
PacifiCorp